Sauvigny-les-Bois is a commune in the Nièvre department in central France. It is located on the junction of the main D18 road with the D209, 9 km south east of Nevers.

Demographics
On 1 January 2019, the estimated population was 1,434.

See also
Communes of the Nièvre department

References

Communes of Nièvre